Jinshaia abbreviata is a species of hillstream loach endemic to China. It is one of three species in the genus Jinshaia.

References

Habitat 

Lives in demersal freshwater environments.

Balitoridae
Fish described in 1892
Taxa named by Albert Günther